Beverly Boulevard is one of the main east–west thoroughfares in Los Angeles, in the U.S. state of California. It begins off Santa Monica Boulevard in Beverly Hills and ends on the Lucas Avenue overpass near downtown Los Angeles to become 1st Street. A separate Beverly Boulevard (carrying Montebello Transit line 40 and nearby Alantic L Line station) begins off 3rd Street and Pomona Boulevard in East Los Angeles, runs through Montebello and Pico Rivera, and becomes Turnbull Canyon Road in Whittier near Rose Hills Memorial Park.

Background

Work on paving Beverly Boulevard through Northwest Los Angeles began in the 1910s, making it one of Los Angeles's first boulevards.

The Boulevard's most famous stretch is in West Hollywood, where it passes Cedars-Sinai Medical Center and the Beverly Center Mall (at the intersection with La Cienega Boulevard). In addition, much of the Fairfax District is centered on Beverly Boulevard. The Grove is southeast of Beverly and Fairfax. The intersection of Beverly and La Cienega is the center of the studio zone (also known as the "thirty-mile zone"), the area that Los Angeles-based entertainment industry unions consider as "local" for purposes of work rules.

Beverly Boulevard runs parallel to Melrose Avenue to the north and 3rd Street to the south. It passes directly through the Wilshire Country Club.

The famous CBS Television City is located on the corner of Beverly and Fairfax, opposite The Grove. Original Tommy's, a famous Southern California burger chain, is located at the corner of Rampart and Beverly Boulevards. Also situated on Beverly Boulevard are studios belonging to Westlake Recording Studios, noted as the site where music albums such as Michael Jackson's Thriller were recorded.

La Cienega Design Quarter
The area of Beverly Boulevard that intersects La Cienega Boulevard and its satellite streets is part of the La Cienega Design Quarter. Its shops and galleries house many antiques, furniture, rugs, accessories, and art.

Education and transportation
 Belmont High School is located at Beverly Boulevard and Belmont Avenue.
 Metro Local line 14 operates on Beverly Boulevard.
 The Metro B Line serves an underground station at Vermont Avenue.

External links

References

Streets in Los Angeles
Streets in Los Angeles County, California
Boulevards in the United States
Central Los Angeles
Fairfax, Los Angeles
Streets in Hollywood, Los Angeles
Montebello, California
Pico Rivera, California
Streets in West Hollywood, California
Westside (Los Angeles County)